Elachista rudectella is a moth of the family Elachistidae. It is found from Germany to Italy, Greece and Romania. It is also found in Russia.

The larvae feed on Phleum phleoides. They mine the leaves of their host plant. The mine is large and opaque and is found in the distal half of the leaf. It occupies the entire width of the leaf and runs upwards to the tip. A single larva mines several leaves. Pupation takes place outside of the mine. They are dark grey with a brownish head. Larvae can be found in April.

References

External links
 

rudectella
Moths described in 1851
Moths of Europe
Taxa named by Henry Tibbats Stainton